Zerno is a rural locality (a settlement) in Novoalexandrovsky Selsoviet, Rubtsovsky District, Altai Krai, Russia. The population was 196 as of 2013. There are 3 streets.

Geography 
Zerno is located 19 km south of Rubtsovsk (the district's administrative centre) by road. Novoaleksandrovka is the nearest rural locality.

References 

Rural localities in Rubtsovsky District